The United Arab Emirates competed in the Summer Olympic Games for the first time at the 1984 Summer Olympics in Los Angeles, United States. Athletes participating included Rashed Jerba, Ibrahim aziz, Helel Ali, and Shadad Mubarak. Muhammed Samy Abdulla and Khamis Ebrahem also competed.

Results by event

Athletics 
Men's 400 metres
 Rashed Jerbeh
 Heat — 48.71 (→ did not advance)

Men's 110 metres hurdles
 Mohamed Helal Ali
 Heat — 15.75 (→ did not advance)

Men's Long Jump
 Shahad Mubarak
 Qualification — 6.98m (→ did not advance, 23rd place)

References 

Nations at the 1984 Summer Olympics
1984
Summer Olympics